Čejov is a municipality and village in Pelhřimov District in the Vysočina Region of the Czech Republic. It has about 600 inhabitants.

Administrative parts
The village of Hadina is an administrative part of Čejov.

References

Villages in Pelhřimov District